The South Fork Elk River is a  stream in Colorado in the United States.  It flows from a source near Dome Lake in Routt National Forest north of Steamboat Springs to a confluence with the Elk River.

See also
 List of rivers of Colorado
 List of tributaries of the Colorado River

References

Rivers of Colorado
Rivers of Routt County, Colorado
Tributaries of the Colorado River in Colorado